Rajiv Malhotra (born 15 September 1950) is an Indian-born American Hindu nationalist ideologue, author and founder of Infinity Foundation, which focuses on Indic studies, and also funds projects such as Columbia University's project to translate the Tibetan Buddhist Tengyur.

Apart from the foundation, Malhotra promotes a Hindu nationalist view on Indic cultures. Malhotra has written prolifically in opposition to the western academic study of Indian culture and society, which he maintains denigrates the tradition and undermines the interests of India "by encouraging the paradigms that oppose its unity and integrity".

Biography
Malhotra studied physics at St. Stephen's College, Delhi and computer science at Syracuse University before becoming an entrepreneur in the information technology and media industries. He took early retirement in 1994 at an age of 44, to establish the Infinity Foundation at Princeton, New Jersey in 1995. Besides directing that foundation, he also chairs the board of governors of the Center for Indic Studies at the University of Massachusetts, Dartmouth, and advises various organisations.

Malhotra had been a speaker at an international conference held over the Center for Indic Studies, University of Massachusetts Dartmouth and was a board member of the Foundation for Indic Philosophy and Culture at the Claremont Colleges. He also wrote extensively on internet discussion groups and e-magazines.

In October 2018, Malhotra was appointed as honorary visiting professor at the Centre for Media Studies at Jawharlal Nehru University, Delhi. On 6 November 2018, he delivered his first lecture organized by the School of Sanskrit and Indic studies on the topic of Sanskrit non-translatables.

Infinity Foundation 
Malhotra founded the institute in 1994; followed by Educational Council of Indic Traditions (ECIT) in 2000.
The foundation works without any full-time workers; sans Malhotra himself. The stated goals were to fight a perceived misrepresentation of ancient Indian religions and to document the contributions of India to world civilization. None of the members of the advisory board was an academic and most belonged to the software industry.

The Foundation has given more than 400 grants for research, education and community work and has provided small grants to major universities in support of programs including a visiting professorship in Indic studies at Harvard University, Yoga and Hindi classes at Rutgers University, the research and teaching of non-dualistic philosophies at University of Hawaii, Global Renaissance Institute and a Center for Buddhist studies at Columbia University, a program in religion and science at University of California, an endowment for the Center for Advanced Study of India at University of Pennsylvania, and lectures at the Center for Consciousness Studies at University of Arizona. The foundation has provided funding for journals like Education about Asia and International Journal of Hindu Studies and for the establishment of the Mahatma Gandhi Center for Global Non-violence at James Madison University.

While the foundation's own materials describe its purposes in terms of education and philanthropy, scholars of Hinduism and South Asia see it largely as an organization committed to the "surveillance of the Academy", and a senior U.S. scholar of Hinduism, Columbia University's Jack Hawley, has published a refutation of the foundation's characteristic charges against the study of Hinduism in North America.

Criticism of American academia (2000s)

Wendy's Child Syndrome

In early 2000s Malhotra started writing articles criticising Wendy Doniger and related scholars, claiming that she applied Freudian psycho-analysis to aspects of Indian culture. His 2002 blog post titled "Wendy's Child Syndrome" was considered as the starting point of a "rift between some Western Hinduism scholars [...] and some conservative Hindus in India, the United States, and elsewhere". Martha Nussbaum has called it a "war" by "the Hindu right" against American scholars.

The blog post "has become a pivotal treatise in a recent rift between some Western Hinduism scholars—many of whom teach or have studied at Chicago—and some conservative Hindus in India, the United States, and elsewhere". Malhotra concluded in his blog post: "Rights of individual scholars must be balanced against rights of cultures and communities they portray, especially minorities that often face intimidation. Scholars should criticize but not define another's religion."

According to Braverman, "Though Malhotra's academic targets say he has some valid discussion points, they also argue that his rhetoric taps into the rightward trend and attempts to silence unorthodox, especially Western, views."

The essay, together with a series of related essays and interviews, has been republished in Academic Hinduphobia, in the wake of the withdrawal of Doniger's The Hindus: An Alternative History from the Indian market, due to a lawsuit "alleging that it was biased and insulting to Hindus". The withdrawal led to extensive media attention, and renewed sales in India. According to Malhotra "the drama has diverted attention away from the substantive errors in her scholarship to be really about being an issue of censorship by radical Hindus", hence the republication of his critique of Wendy Doniger and scholars related to her.

American academia
In his 2003 blog post "Does South Asian Studies Undermine India?" at Rediff India Abroad: India as it happens, Malhotra criticises what he views as uncritical funding of South Asian Studies by Indian-American donors. According to Malhotra: 

Malhotra voices four criticisms of American academia: 
 "American academia is dominated by a Eurocentric perspective that views western culture as being the font of world civilisation and refuses to acknowledge the contributions of non-western societies such as India to European culture and technique".
 The academic study of religion in the United States is based on the model of the "Abrahamic" traditions; this model is not applicable to Hinduism.
 Western scholars focus on the "sensationalist, negative attributes of religion and present it in a demeaning way that shows a lack of respect for the sentiments of the practitioners of the religion".
 South Asian Studies programmes in the United States create "a false identity and unity" between India and its Muslim neighbour states, and undermine India "by focusing on its internal cleavages and problems".

Malhotra argues that American scholarship has undermined India "by encouraging the paradigms that oppose its unity and integrity", with scholars playing critical roles, often under the garb of 'human rights' in channelling foreign intellectual and material support to exacerbate India's internal cleavages. According to Malhotra, Indian-American donors were "hoodwinked" into thinking that they were supporting India through their monetary contributions to such programmes. Malhotra compares the defence of Indian interests with corporate brand management, distrusting the loyalties of Indian scholars:

According to Malhotra, a positive stance on India has been under-represented in American academia, due to programmes being staffed by Westerners, their "Indian-American Sepoys" and Indian Americans wanting to be white — whom he disparages as "career opportunists" and "Uncle Toms" who "in their desire to become even marginal members of the Western Grand Narrative sneer at Indian culture in the same manner as colonialists once did". Malhotra has accused academia of abetting the "Talibanisation" of India, which would also lead to the radicalisation of other Asian countries.

U-turn theory

According to Malhotra, the Western appropriation of Indic ideas and knowledge systems has a long history. "The U-Turn Theory", as stated by Malhotra, the appropriation occurs in several stages:
 In the first stage, a Westerner approaches an Indian guru or tradition with extreme deference, acquires the knowledge as a sincere disciple, lives in the ashram and adopts the usage of Hindu iconography. 
 Once the transfer of knowledge is complete, the former disciple, and their followers progressively erase all traces of the original source, such as removal of the Sanskrit terms and historic context of India. The knowledge gets repackaged as the idea of their own thought or they claim to be universal by removal of the Indian heritage, and may even proceed to denigrate the source Indian tradition. At this stage, the traditional Indian knowledge gets decontextualized and Christianized.
 In the final stage, the ideas are exported back to India by the former disciple and/or his followers for consumption as Western science or as 'superior' thought.  Malhotra cites numerous examples to support this theory, dating from the erasure of Upanishadic and Vijnanavada Buddhist influences on Plotinus to the modern day reimportation of Christian Yoga into India.

Malhotra mentions a number of "U-Turners" from the scholarly fields of mind sciences, cognitive sciences and psychology:
 The theory of multiple intelligences by Howard Gardner was inspired from the original works of Sri Aurobindo's Planes and Parts of the Being. 
 The techniques followed in Herbert Benson's The Relaxation Response matches that of Maharishi Mahesh Yogi's Transcendental Meditation (TM) teachings, but Malhotra critiques that Benson doesn't acknowledge the source on his scholarly works. Malhotra refers to various western sources to support his argument. Furthermore, Malhotra claims that, Benson nudges towards Christianization through his 1987 book Your Maximum Mind by introducing faith and hope into his trademark technique, Benson Method, through funding from Templeton Foundation.
 Daniel Goleman, famously known as the originator of Emotional intelligence, didn't mention the teachings of Neem Karoli Baba on his academic work, who have had a primal influence on Goleman during his time in India. Although Goleman used Dalai Lama for his introductions, he was peer pressured to disguise the "Indian background" during his PhD dissertation.
 Jon Kabat-Zinn applied Buddhist meditation techniques in therapeutic and medical settings under the name of Mindfulness Meditation, however, Kabat-Zinn doesn't credit the source Buddhist meditations, but called it his "own" by mentioning that he "developed" the techniques, according to Malhotra, commercially franchising of Vipassanā.

In Vivekananda's Ideas and the Two Revolutions in Western Thought (2013), Malhotra claims that Vivekananda has deeply influenced modern western thought, but that this influence in some cases remains unacknowledged and uncredited. According to Malhotra, examples are William James and his The Varieties of Religious Experience (1902); Aldous Huxley and his The Perennial Philosophy (1945); and the notion of involution in the works of Ken Wilber, a term which Vivekananda probably took from western Theosophists, notably Helena Blavatsky, in addition to Darwin's notion of evolution, and possibly referring to the Samkhya term sātkarya.

Criticism of Christian Yoga 
According to Malhotra, the practice of distorted version of Yoga, Christian Yoga, is not only inimical but also detrimental to Christianity's fundamental principles and doctrines. He supports his argument by specifically citing the theology of Christianity and Bible, and compares it to the philosophies of Yoga.
 Yoga transcends all dogma and beliefs.
 Yoga, meditation and Mantras cannot transcend the person, who believes in the historicity of Christianity and various events. Yogic path of embodied-knowing seeks to dissolve the historic ego, both individual and collective as false. Yoga is a do-it-yourself path that eliminates the need for intermediaries such as a priesthood or other institutional authority. Its emphasis on the body runs contrary to Christian beliefs that the body will lead humans astray. The ultimate goal is to move to a state of self-realization. 
 Yoga leads to unity consciousness i.e. no separation from God.
 According to Vedanta, a being is not separate from God, we're a divine being ourself and we're part of God and creation. However, this fundamental teaching of Yoga contradicts Christianity's beliefs that God and creation are separate entities. 
 Bible considers the silent mind to be dangerous.
 According to Christianity, in prayer, you're supposed to be filled with Biblical passage, and Nicene Creed diverts attention away from the state of silence, however, the whole practice of meditation in authentic Yoga system is to pursue the state of emptiness with refined focus to self-direct awareness to attain liberation, contrary to be filled with dogma. Yoga's self-centering silence is seen as resisting submission to an external God according to Christianity.
 Christianity considers Mantras as 'prayer' to a pagan God, which violates a Commandment.
 Although Mantras are neither mere prayer nor devotional songs to a God but a sacred utterance for transcendence, enlightenment and liberation, the usage of Mantras violates the Commandment. Christianity neither accepts Mantra for transcendence nor accepts as a prayer to 'One True God'.
 Biblical cosmology subverts the Vedic principal of Rta.
 Rta, in Hindu philosophy, is the fundamental fabric of reality and the principle of the natural order which regulates and coordinates the operation of the universe and everything within it. Conceptually, it's closely allied with Dharma, and the action of individuals in relation to those ordinances, referred to as Karma. However, this fundamentally contradicts Nicene Creed.
Malhotra further mentions that practitioners of Christian Yoga and people who advocate it, neither understand Christianity nor the roots, complexity, and philosophies of Yoga. According to Shreena Gandhi, professor of Religious studies at Michigan State University, many American Yoga teachers do not learn about Hinduism, Indian culture and spiritual philosophies of Yoga. So, only far few American teachers go much deeper than mere physical forms or Asanas, hence they dilute the true depth and philosophies of Yoga. Most Western Yoga teachers, states Malhotra, mentions Pranayama, chanting Om or Asanas as health-related components of modern Yoga, yet this attitude is based, at best, a shallow or lack of understanding of Yoga'a Dharmic roots and philosophy.

The practice of Om as a sacred utterance is designed to dissolve Namarupa from the mind, that is the whole idea and the principle behind the Mantra. Its universality lies in its ability to transcend all particular historic contexts. The names 'Jesus', 'Allah', or 'Amen' are proper nouns laden with historic context and aren't a synonym for a Mantra which have a specific transcendental context. Patanjali mentions Om as Vacakah or vibration of Ishvara, hence the experience it brings cannot be generated by an alternative sound such as the sound or names of other God. Yoga and Hinduism are deeply coupled, and renaming the original Sanskrit terms doesn't do any favor, since the actual physical practices, in the case of asanas remains the same, states Malhotra. Swami Param, head of Classical Yoga Academy in Manahawkin, New Jersey, states that "If people could not acknowledge the Hindu elements and roots of Yoga, they should not bother studying it." He further adds, "As Hindus, we have no problem studying other religions, but we give them the respect they deserve."

Yoga's metaphysics centers around the quest to attain liberation from one's conditioning caused by the past Karma. Karma includes the baggage from prior lives, underscoring the importance of reincarnation. Malhotra points out, while it's "fashionable" for Westerners to say that, they believe in Karma and reincarnation, they have seldom worked out the contradictions with core Biblical doctrines. Yogic liberation is therefore not contingent upon any unique historic events or interventions. Every individual's ultimate essence is Sat-Cit-Ananda, Originally Divine, and not Originally Sinful by birth, Malhotra indicates this very fundamental contradiction of the doctrines of Original sin and Nicene Creed.

Malhotra further claims that Dharmic traditions are misunderstood by the West, one being the scholars conflated the use of Dharmic images and deities with pre-Christian Peganism, although Paganism is quite different from Dharmic bhakti. This suspicion of idolatry is one of the greatest obstacles which the Western practitioners of Yoga face, states Malhotra. The negative and erroneous association of Yoga with an idolatry of the body gives rise to odd hybrids such as Christian Yoga or Jewish Yoga or, Muslim Yoga, who claim to provide a cleaned-up Yoga, which is free from dangers of idolatry. He adds, internalized taboos, social prejudices, and all stereotypes of Dharmic culture and Hinduism in particular, act as a filter in the interpretation of Dharmic traditions, such as Yoga and meditation to create varied responses to Yoga.

Although few Christian Yoga or 'Secular' Yoga practitioners make baseless claims, states Malhotra, such as "Yoga doesn't belong to Hinduism" or "Yoga isn't Hindu", he asserts that, such people neither understands the philosophy Yoga nor its relation to Hinduism. It's a fact of the matter that Yoga is one of the six major orthodox schools of Hinduism (Āstika), hence those preconceived claims are factually incorrect. Yoga, in Hinduism, is a way towards liberation from Saṃsāra and Duḥkha.

Furthermore, Malhotra cites a survey research conducted by the Yoga practitioners in the West shows that those who attained a sense of self-directed awareness, are less likely to identify as "Christians" or any dogma based religions, and more likely identified to be with Dharmic religions such as, Buddhists, or, contrary to that as Spiritual but not religious. Douglas R. Groothuis, professor of philosophy at Denver Seminary, says that "Yoga was a Hindu practice structured to help people attain a higher spiritual state within, and that is incompatible with Christian teachings", further he adds, "I don't think Christian Yoga works, It's an oxymoron".

Academic Hinduphobia: A Critique of Wendy Doniger's Erotic School of Indology (early 2000s/2016)
Several of Malhotra's essays from the early 2000s were re-published by Voice of India in 2016 in Academic Hinduphobia: A Critique of Wendy Doniger's Erotic School of Indology. According to Malhotra, the essays have been republished in the wake of the withdrawal of Doniger's The Hindus: An Alternative History from the Indian market, due to a lawsuit "alleging that it was biased and insulting to Hindus". The withdrawal led to extensive media attention, and renewed sales in India. According to Malhotra "the drama has diverted attention away from the substantive errors in her scholarship to be really about being an issue of censorship by radical Hindus", hence the republication of his critique of Wendy Doniger and scholars related to her.

Breaking India (2011)

Malhotra's book Breaking India: Western Interventions in Dravidian and Dalit Faultlines discusses three faultlines trying to destabilise India:  
 Islamic radicalism linked with Pakistan. 
 Maoists and Marxist radicals supported by China via intermediaries such as Nepal. 
 Dravidian and Dalit identity separatism being fostered by the West in the name of human rights. 
This book goes into greater depth on the third: the role of US and European churches, academics, think-tanks, foundations, government and human rights groups in fostering separation of the identities of Dravidian and Dalit communities from the rest of India.

Being Different (2011)

Being Different is a critique of the western-centric view on India, characterised by the Abrahamic traditions. Malhotra intends to give an Indian view on India and the west, as characterised by the Indian Dharmic traditions. Malhotra argues that there are irreconcilable differences between Dharmic traditions and Abrahamic religions. The term dharma:

Indra's Net (2014)

Indra's Net is an appeal against the thesis of neo-Hinduism and a defense of Vivekananda's view of Yoga and Vedanta. The book argues for a unity, coherence, and continuity of the Yogic and Vedantic traditions of Hinduism and Hindu philosophy. It makes proposals for defending Hinduism from what the author considers to be unjust attacks from scholars, misguided public intellectuals, and hostile religious polemicists.

The book's central metaphor is "Indra's Net". As a scriptural image "Indra's Net" was first mentioned in the Atharva Veda (c. 1000 BCE). In Buddhist philosophy, Indra's Net served as a metaphor in the Avatamsaka Sutra and was further developed by Huayen Buddhism to portray the interconnectedness of everything in the universe.
Malhotra employs the metaphor of Indra's Net to express

The book uses Indra's Net as a metaphor for the understanding of the universe as a web of connections and interdependences, an understanding which Malhotra wants to revive as the foundation for Vedic cosmology, a perspective that he asserts has "always been implicit" in the outlook of the ordinary Hindu.

A revised edition was published in 2016, after charges of plagiarism. The revised edition omits most references to the work of Andrew J. Nicholson but rather refers original Sanskrit sources instead which according to Malhotra, Nicholson failed to attribute his ideas to and explains that the unity of Hinduism is inherent in the tradition from the times of its Vedic origins.

The Battle for Sanskrit (2016)

The Battle for Sanskrit is a critique of the American indologist Sheldon Pollock. Malhotra pleads for traditional Indian scholars to write responses to Pollock's views, who takes a critical stance toward the role of Sanskrit in traditional views on Indian society. Malhotra is critical of Pollock's approach, and argues that western Indology scholars are deliberately intervening in Indian societies by offering analyses of Sanskrit texts which would be rejected by "the traditional Indian experts".

Sanskrit Non-Translatables: The Importance of Sanskritizing English (2020)
Sanskrit Non-Translatables, a book by Malhotra published in 2020 and coauthored by Satyanarayana Dasa, deals with the idea of Sanskritizing the English language and enriching it with powerful Sanskrit words. It continues the discussion on the idea of non-translatability of Sanskrit, first introduced in the book, Being Different.

The book discusses 54 non-translatables across various genres that are being commonly mis-translated. It empowers English speakers with the knowledge and arguments to introduce these Sanskrit words into their daily speech with confidence. For English readers, the book is the starting point of the movement to introduce loanwords into their English vocabulary without translation.

Reception

Appreciation
Scholars have widely recognized that Malhotra has been influential in articulating diaspora and conservative dissatisfaction with the Western world's scholarly study of Hinduism. John Hinnells, a British scholar of comparative religions, considers Malhotra to lead a faction of Hindu criticism of methodology for the examination of Hinduism.

Other scholars welcome his attempt to challenge the western assumptions in the study of India and South Asia but also question his approach, finding it to be neglecting the differences within the various Indian traditions. In response, Malhotra points out that he does not state that all those traditions are essentially the same, that there is no effort to homogenise different Dharmic traditions, but that they share the assertion of integral unity.

Prema A. Kurien considers Malhotra to be at "the forefront of American Hindu effort to challenge the Eurocentricism in the academia".

Criticism
Martha Nussbaum criticises Malhotra for "disregard for the usual canons of argument and scholarship, a postmodern power play in the guise of defense of tradition". Brian K. Pennington has called his work "ahistorical" and "a pastiche of widely accepted and overly simplified conclusions borrowed from the academy". Pennington has further charged that Malhotra systematically misrepresents the relationship between Hinduism and Christianity, arguing that in Malhotra's hands, "Christian and Indic traditions are reduced to mere cartoons of themselves." According to Jonathan Edelmann, one of the major problems with Malhotra's work is that he does not have a school of thought that he represents or is trained in. This fact undermines his claims to be engaged in purvapaksa debate. Purvapaksa debate requires location in a particular place of argument.

In May 2015, St. Olaf College Hindu-American scholar Anantanand Rambachan, who studied three years with Swami Dayananda, published an extensive response to Malhotra's criticisms in Indra's Net charging that Malhotra's "descriptions of my scholarship belong appropriately to the realm of fiction and are disconnected from reality". According to Rambachan, Malhotra's understanding and representation of classical Advaita is incorrect, attributing doctrines to Shankara and Swami Dayananda which are rejected by them. Malhotra's epistemological foundations have also been critically questioned by Anantanand Rambachan. He does not, according to Rambachan, situate his discussion in relation to classical epistemologies or clarify his differences with these.

Malhotra's critiques on Wendy Doniger's Freud psychoanalytic interpretations of Hinduism on her academic works, have "led to verbal and physical attacks on western scholars and their institutions."

Malhotra claimed on social media in August 2020 that he spoke out against Wikipedia in the 1990s in a talk in Auroville that was posted in their magazine, when the portal sought Indian users for donations. Wikipedia, on the other hand, was founded in 2001. Malhotra's claims were criticized on social media.

In November 2022, Google cancelled Malhotra's talk at its headquarters after receiving complaints about his views on homosexuality and Islam. A day after cancelling his talk, Google introduced rules for inviting guest speakers to its offices.

Allegations of plagiarism
In July 2015, Richard Fox Young of Princeton Theological Seminary and Andrew J.Nicholson who authored Unifying Hinduism, alleged Malhotra had plagiarized Unifying Hinduism in Indra's Net. Nicholson further said that Malhotra not only had plagiarised his book, but also "twists the words and arguments of respectable scholars to suit his own ends". Permanent Black, publisher of Nicholson's Unifying Hinduism, stated that they would welcome HarperCollins' "willingness to rectify future editions" of Indra's Net.

In response to Nicholson, Malhotra stated "I used your work with explicit references 30 times in Indra's Net, hence there was no ill-intention", and cited a list of these references. He announced that he would be eliminating all references to Nicholson and further explained: According to Malhotra, he removed all references of Nicholson in chapter 8 of Indra's Net, replacing them with references to the original Indian sources.

Publications

Books

 Breaking India: Western Interventions in Dravidian and Dalit Faultlines (2011) (publisher: Amaryllis, An imprint of Manjul Publishing House Pvt. Ltd.)
 Rajiv Malhotra (2011), Being Different: An Indian Challenge to Western Universalism (publisher: HarperCollins India)
 Rajiv Malhotra (2014), Indra's Net: Defending Hinduism's Philosophical Unity (publisher: HarperCollins India)
 Rajiv Malhotra (2016), Battle for Sanskrit: Dead or Alive, Oppressive or Liberating, Political or Sacred? (publisher: Harper Collins India)
 Rajiv Malhotra and Satyanarayana Dasa Babaji (2020), Sanskrit Non-Translatables: The Importance of Sanskritizing English (publisher: Amaryllis, An imprint of Manjul Publishing House Pvt. Ltd.)
 Rajiv Malhotra and Vijaya Viswanathan (2022), Snakes in the Ganga: Breaking India 2.0, (publisher: Occam, An imprint of BluOne Ink, LLP; ISBN 978-9392209093)

Other publications

 
 Antonio de Nicolas, Krishnan Ramaswamy, and Aditi Banerjee (eds.) (2007), Invading the Sacred: An Analysis Of Hinduism Studies In America (publisher:  Rupa & Co.)

See also

 François Gautier
 Madhu Kishwar
 Kanchan Gupta
 Arun Shourie
 Kali's Child
 Anantanand Rambachan
 Bengali Renaissance
 Indian independence movement
 Neo-Vedanta
 Postcolonialism
 Anti-Hinduism
 Invading the Sacred
 Sepoy

Notes

Subnotes

References

Sources

Printed sources

Web-sources

Further reading

 
 
 
 

Malhotra's criticisms
 

Background information
  (266 pages), paperback

External links
 
 The Infinity Foundation
 Huffington Post – Blog by Rajiv Malhotra
 Swadeshi Indology Youtube channel
 Infinity Foundation India Youtube

1950 births
Hindu revivalist writers
Hindu writers
Indian business executives
Businesspeople from Delhi
Indian emigrants to the United States
Indian Hindus
Living people
People from New Delhi
St. Stephen's College, Delhi alumni
Syracuse University alumni
21st-century Indian non-fiction writers
Indian political writers
Writers from Delhi
Indian activists
American people of Indian descent